Sir (John) Keith Waller  (19 February 191414 November 1992) was a senior Australian public servant and diplomat.

Life and career
Keith Waller was born in Melbourne in 1914. He was educated at Scotch College and the University of Melbourne.

Waller joined the Commonwealth Public Service in 1936, in the Department of External Affairs. In 1937 he was appointed Private Secretary to Billy Hughes, then Minister for External Affairs.

His career proved to be long and successful, establishing himself as a successful diplomat across a number of postings, including to Moscow, Washington and Bangkok. In 1943 whilst senior officer to the Australian Legation at Chungking, Waller married Alison Dent in Bombay, India.

Waller was Australian Consul-General in Manila from 1948 to 1950. During this time he dealt with the fall-out of the Lorenzo Gamboa case, which saw a Filipino man separated from his wife and children due to the White Australia policy. He received death threats, but later downplayed its significance and dismissed it as a "trivial case".

He was appointed Secretary of the Department of External Affairs (later Department of Foreign Affairs in 1970), retiring from the public service in 1974 on his 60th birthday.

Soon after his retirement, Waller prepared a brief assessing the Australian Government security and intelligence apparatus as it existed in the mid-1970s.

Waller died in Canberra on 14 November 1992 aged 78.

Awards
In June 1961, Waller was appointed a Commander of the Order of the British Empire whilst Ambassador to the USSR. He was made a Knight Bachelor in 1968 during his time as Ambassador to the United States of America.

A street in the Canberra suburb of Casey was named Keith Waller Rise in 2011, in Waller's honour.

References

1914 births
1992 deaths
Australian Commanders of the Order of the British Empire
Australian Knights Bachelor
Ambassadors of Australia to the Philippines
Ambassadors of Australia to the Soviet Union
Ambassadors of Australia to Thailand
Ambassadors of Australia to the United States
20th-century Australian public servants